
In the calculus of variations the Legendre–Clebsch condition is a second-order condition which a solution of the Euler–Lagrange equation must satisfy in order to be a minimum.

For the problem of minimizing

the condition is

Generalized Legendre–Clebsch

In optimal control, the situation is more complicated because of the possibility of a singular solution.  The generalized Legendre–Clebsch condition, also known as convexity, is a sufficient condition for local optimality such that when the linear sensitivity of the Hamiltonian to changes in u is zero, i.e.,

 

The Hessian of the Hamiltonian is positive definite along the trajectory of the solution:

 

In words, the generalized LC condition guarantees that over a singular arc, the Hamiltonian is minimized.

See also
 Bang–bang control

References

Further reading
 
 

Optimal control
Calculus of variations